The United States men's national lacrosse team has won ten of thirteen World Lacrosse Championships, the most recent in 2018. Team USA finished second in the other three field lacrosse tournaments, losing to Canada in 1978, 2006, and 2014.

The team is organized by US Lacrosse, the national governing body. The roster usually consists of lacrosse players who play in the Premier Lacrosse League.

Competition achievements

Olympic Games

World Championships

2023 team 
US Lacrosse announced their 23 man roster for the 2023 World Lacrosse Championship on December 20, 2022.

2018 team
US Lacrosse announced the final 23-man roster for the 2018 World Lacrosse Championship on January 7, 2018.

2014 team
US Lacrosse finalized its 23-man roster on June 30, 2014, by cutting eight players that were on the roster for the Team USA versus MLL All Star game on June 26, 2014.

Starting attack

Other attackmen

Starting midfield

Other midfielders

Faceoff

Starting defense

Other defensemen

Goalkeepers

2010 team

Attackmen

Midfielders

Defense

Goalkeepers

Four-time national team members

Three-time national team members
Players are listed in alphabetical order by last name.

See also
World Lacrosse Championship
United States national indoor lacrosse team

References

External links
U.S. Men's National Team website
US Lacrosse website

Lacrosse teams in the United States
National lacrosse teams
Lacrosse